Dzhurak is a rural locality (a settlement) in Astrakhansky Selsoviet, Narimanovsky District, Astrakhan Oblast, Russia. The population was 214 as of 2010. There are 4 streets.

Geography 
Dzhurak is located 144 km southwest of Narimanov (the district's administrative centre) by road. Prikaspiysky is the nearest rural locality.

References 

Rural localities in Narimanovsky District